The British Universities Lifesaving Clubs' Association (BULSCA) is the governing body for lifesaving sport at the University level in the United Kingdom.  It organises the university-level competition schedule, assists with the training of judges, and hosts an annual Student National Championship.  BULSCA organises competitions in England, Scotland, and Wales and also includes member teams from Northern Ireland and Ireland. In recent years the club has also been represented at international competition, including the Grand Prix Moravie held in Brno, Czech Republic. For the years 2018/2019 and 2019/2020 the BULSCA championships at Swansea and Bristol respectively also played host to a team representing Greek Universities.

History

Competitive lifesaving between clubs at universities across Britain began as a small collaboration between rival clubs over 15 years ago and quickly expanded as more clubs became involved. The formation of BULSCA in 2002 was in response to this growing popularity of lifesaving sport at universities; with the university lifesaving league being established in the 2002/03 season to provide a connection between the various competitions hosted by the universities over a season.

It is now not uncommon to see 20 to 30 teams at a majority of the competitions. In addition, to the BULSCA league, BULSCA introduced the Student Nationals, a full weekend of competition combining both speed events and traditional events.

As BULSCA grew in size and ambition it became necessary to form a full committee, made up of a mixture of current BULSCA members and BULSCA “old boys”. This was formed in 2007.

Today the BULSCA calendar is extensive with some clubs taking part in around 8 BULSCA league competitions a year as well as Student National Championships, and other regional, national and international competitions.
 
BULSCA has also provided volunteers for events such as the London Triathlon, the Blenheim Triathlon, the RLSS’s ‘Save a Baby’s Life’ and ‘Get Safe 4 Summer‘ campaigns, along with many more local small scale events. Although BULSCA predominantly exists to run the league and championships, BULSCA are now making efforts to run courses which will aid  members through their lifesaving time, and to encourage participation in Lifesaving and Lifesaving Sport.

Competitions

League Competitions

Competitions take place throughout the year in line with University term dates, i.e. from October to Christmas and from January to May. Each competition is hosted by one of the member clubs. Clubs typically enter one or two teams (an "A" and "B" team), and each year there is both a league for A and B teams. A full list of league results can be found here.

Fixed Events

These events occur at every BULSCA competition.

Dry and wet Simulated Emergency Response Competition
Rope Throw Relay
Swim and Tow

Variable Events

Hosting universities have some flexibility with these events, having to include at least one of the following events.

Medley Relay
Manikin Carry Relay
Obstacles Relay

League results

Championships

BULSCA also host BULSCA Student National Championships every year. This competition takes place over 2 days with teams competing in squads of 12 (6 male and 6 female rather than the usual teams of 4 mixed). On the Saturday teams compete in speed lifesaving events in teams and individually. On the Sunday the teams compete in teams of 4 in the same events as a normal league competition. The winner of the competition is the squad which performs best over the 2 days.

Individual Speeds Events

Line Throw
200m Obstacles
200m Super Lifesaver
50m Manikin Carry
100m Rescue Medley
100m Manikin Tow with Fins
100m Manikin Carry with Fins

Team Speeds Events

4 x Line Throw
4 x 50m Obstacles
4 x 25m Manikin Carry
4 x 50m Medley Relay

Sunday Events

Dry Simulated Emergency Response Competition
RNLI Simulated Emergency Response Competition
Wet Simulated Emergency Response Competition
Line Throw Relay
Swim Tow Relay

References

External links
 British Universities Lifesaving Clubs' Association
 Promotional Video 

Lifesaving organizations
Sports organisations of the United Kingdom
Sports organizations established in 2002
Lifesaving
Swimming in the United Kingdom
2002 establishments in the United Kingdom
Student sports governing bodies